John Berwick Harwood (1828 – 15 February 1899) was an English writer, best known for his ghost stories. He wrote many (usually anonymous) stories and articles, some of them about his experiences in China. He contributed short stories to Once A Week, Cassell's Family Magazine, Blackwood's Magazine and the Cornhill Magazine. He wrote about twenty novels and several Christmas horror tales.

He married Emily Mary Worsop Trollope in Ostend, Belgium, on 24 April 1850.

Bibliography

 published anonymously in Blackwood's Magazine
 Part of a frame story called Tom Tiddler's Ground that was edited by Charles Dickens and written by Dickens and four other authors.

 Part of a frame story called Tom Tiddler's Ground that was edited by Charles Dickens and written by Dickens and four other authors.
 Part of a frame story called Tenants at Will in the Christmas Number of Chambers's Journal
 Part of a frame story called Tenants at Will in the Christmas Number of Chambers's Journal

References

External links
 John Berwick Harwood grave monument at gravestonephotos.com.

1828 births
1899 deaths
19th-century English people
English horror writers
English male writers